Charles "Charlie" Philip Smith (June 18, 1926 – July 12, 2014) was an American Democratic politician.

Born in Chicago, Illinois, he lived with his family in Oconto, Wisconsin. In 1940, Smith moved to Madison, Wisconsin, where he graduated from Madison West High School. He served in the United States Marine Corps during World War II. In 1950, he graduated from Milton College and was a company production supervisor. He also worked in the insurance business and for Mobil and Olin Companies. In 1952–1953, Smith served on the Dane County, Wisconsin Board of Supervisors. He then served as Wisconsin State Treasurer from 1971 to 1991. He died in Madison, Wisconsin.

Notes

1926 births
2014 deaths
Politicians from Chicago
Politicians from Madison, Wisconsin
Milton College alumni
Wisconsin Democrats
County supervisors in Wisconsin
State treasurers of Wisconsin
United States Marine Corps personnel of World War II
Military personnel from Madison, Wisconsin
People from Oconto, Wisconsin
Madison West High School alumni